The 2022 Russian invasion of Ukraine is extensively covered on Wikipedia across many languages. This coverage includes articles on and related to the invasion itself, and updates of previously existing articles to take the invasion into account. Wikipedia and other Wikimedia projects' coverage of the conflict – and how the volunteer editing community achieved that coverage – has received significant media and government attention.

History

On March 1, 2022, one week after Russia launched an invasion of Ukraine, the Russian-language edition of the online encyclopedia Wikipedia announced that the Russian government had threatened to block access to Wikipedia in the country. The Russian government cited "illegally distributed information" present on the Russian Wikipedia article of the invasion, including Russian casualties and treatment of Ukrainian civilians—Wikipedia had previously been blocked in 2015 for similar reasons. Local downloads of the Russian Wikipedia for offline use from Kiwix increased by over 4,000% following the beginning of the invasion amid fears of a Russian block, and over 105,000 downloads had been made during the first half of March. 

In Belarus, Russian Wikipedia editor Mark Bernstein was arrested after having been doxxed (having his personal identity revealed) in relation to his editing and writing about the invasion.

On 1 March 2022, the Russian-language Wikipedia published a picture of the Russian government's media regulator Roskomnadzor threatening to block access to the website in Russia over the Russian-language article Russian invasion of Ukraine in 2022, claiming that the article contains "illegally distributed information", including "reports about numerous casualties among service personnel of the Russian Federation and also the civilian population of Ukraine, including children". 

On 16 March 2022, the Russian Agency of Legal and Judicial Information (news agency founded by the RIA Novosti, the Constitutional Court of Russia, the Supreme Court of Russia, and the Supreme Court of Arbitration of Russia in 2009) published an interview of Alexander Malkevich, the deputy chairman of the commission on the development of information society, media and mass communications of the Civic Chamber of the Russian Federation. In this interview, Malkevich said that Wikipedia (both Russian and others) was becoming a "bridgehead for informational war against Russia". He also stated that Russian law-enforcement agencies had identified thirteen persons who were carrying out "politically engaged editing" Wikipedia's articles, and about 30,000 bloggers "participating in informational war against Russia".

According to Novaya Gazeta, pro-Kremlin structures related to Yevgeny Prigozhin are actively involved in doxing "coordinators of an informational attack on Russia", including Wikipedia editors. Novaya Gazeta also reports that Special Communications Service of Russia (a division of the Federal Protective Service) employees are trying to disseminate pro-Kremlin propaganda by editing Wikipedia articles.

On 31 March, Roskomnadzor demanded that Wikipedia remove any information about the invasion that is "misinforming" Russians, or it could face a fine of up to 4 million rubles (approximately $49,000 or $47,000). In June 2022, the Wikimedia Foundation appealed the fine, arguing that people in Russia have the right to access knowledge about the invasion.

In April 2022, EU vs Disinfo found that four pro-Russian disinformation news outlets were referenced in at least 625 Wikipedia articles. Most of these references were in the Russian Wikipedia (136 articles), Arabic Wikipedia (70), Spanish Wikipedia (52), Portuguese Wikipedia (45) and Vietnamese Wikipedia (32). The English Wikipedia has removed most references to these outlets.

In April-May 2022, the Russian authorities put several Wikipedia articles on their list of forbidden sites. The list included the articles 2022 Russian invasion of Ukraine, Rashism, several articles in Russian Wikipedia devoted to the military action and war crimes during the Russo-Ukrainian War, and 2 sections of the Russian article about Vladimir Putin.

On 20 July 2022, due to the refusal of Wikipedia to remove the articles about the Russian-Ukrainian war, Roskomnadzor ordered search engines to mark Wikipedia as a violator of Russian laws.

On 1 November 2022, the Wikimedia Foundation was fined 2 million rubles by a Russian court for not deleting two articles on Russian Wikipedia.

Responses from Wikipedia 
The Georgian and Ukrainian Wikipedias changed their logos to reflect the blue and gold coloring of Ukraine's flag.

The Wikimedia Foundation released a statement on 1 March 2022, calling for "continued access to free and open knowledge" and for "an immediate and peaceful resolution to the conflict".

See also 
 Detention of Pavel Pernikaŭ
 Blocking of Wikipedia in Russia
 Censorship in the Russian Federation

References

Further reading
 
 
 

2022 Russian invasion of Ukraine
Wikipedia controversies
Wikipedia coverage of specific events